Sorry We're Late But We're Worth The Wait is the debut studio album released by power pop band Magic Eight Ball. Music videos were made for the singles "Monkey Bars" and "Russian Ballet"

Background 
The songs on Magic Eight Ball's debut album span a larger period of time than their subsequent releases. The earliest of which are "Before It Was Murder" and "Local Girls" which date back to 1999 in their earliest forms, whereas songs like "Russian Ballet", "Monkey Bars" and "Something Better Has Come Along" were mostly written in the year or so leading up to going into the studio for the album. Between 2007 and 2011, half of the songs on 'Sorry We're Late...' were also recorded in their original versions for the band's first two EPs, "A Peacock's Tale" and "Mother Nature's Candy" . It was during that time that Magic Eight Ball front man Baz Francis began working with Dave Draper. Baz felt Dave was the best producer to help create Magic Eight Ball's music. Before the recording process had wrapped up, Baz went on the road in Europe with Donnie Vie on The Magical History Tour, and Vie contributed to the song "Before It Was Murder (You Got Me Talking)" before heading back to the United States. The album's name was coined by Baz Francis.

The album was re-released on iTunes on 13 April 2016.

Track listing 
All songs written by Baz Francis.

Personnel

Musicians 
 Baz Francis – Vocals, guitar, bass & other flourishes
 Jason Bowld – Drums

Additional musicians 
 Robbie J. Holland – Backing vocals on "Sunday Mornings" and hand claps on "Big Star"
 Donnie Vie – Additional vocals on "Before It Was Murder (You Got Me Talking)"
 Kay Dougan – Handclaps on "Before It Was Murder (You Got Me Talking)"
 Oly Edkins – Handclaps on "Before It Was Murder (You Got Me Talking)" 
 Dave Draper – Additional electric guitar on "Never Need New Genes"
 Matthew Colley – Piano on ‘Monkey Bars’
 Introductory hijinks on "Something Better Has Come Along" by Baz Francis, Robbie J. Holland, Kay Dougan & Oly Edkins

Production 
 Dave Draper – Recording, mixing and mastering
 Donnie Vie – Executive Producer 
 Sean Rea – Additional backing vocal arrangement on "Local Girls"
 Jack Jones – Original demo production for "Local Girls" and "Before It Was Murder (You Got Me Talking)"

Art direction 
 Kay Dougan – All illustrations & Photo editing
 Tariq Hussain – Artwork layout
 Baz Francis – Original design concept
 Angel Dean Brown – Band photography & Photo editing
 Maryhèléna Francis – Centerfold calligraphy

References

External links

2013 debut albums
Magic Eight Ball albums